The Qatar Armed Forces are the military forces of the  State of Qatar. Since 2015, Qatar has implemented mandatory military conscription with an average of 2,000 graduates per year. As of 2010, Qatar's defence expenditures added up to a total of $1.913 billion, about 1.5% of the national GDP, according to the SIPRI. Qatar has recently signed defence pacts with the United States in 2002 & 2013, with the United Kingdom in 2020 , and with France in 1994. 

Qatar plays an active role in the collective defense efforts of the Gulf Cooperation Council; the other five members are Saudi Arabia, Kuwait, Bahrain, the UAE, and Oman. Qatar also hosts the largest American military base in the Middle East and in 2017 inaugurated a military attache office in Washington. 

SIPRI states that Qatar's plans to transform and significantly enlarge its armed forces have accelerated in 2014, and in 2010-14 Qatar was the 46th largest arms importer in the world. Orders in 2013 for 562 tanks and 75 self-propelled guns from Germany were followed in 2014 by a number of other contracts, including 34 combat helicopters and 3 AEW aircraft from the US, and 6 tanker aircraft from Spain. As of 2016, Qatar maintains advanced anti air and anti ship capabilities with deliveries of Patriot PAC-3 MSE Batteries, Exocet MM40 Block 3 and Marte ER anti-ship missiles.

History
The armed forces were founded in 1971 after the country gained independence from the United Kingdom.

With a personnel strength of 11,800, Qatar's armed forces are the second-smallest in the Middle East. France has provided approximately 80% of Qatar's arms inventory. 
Qatar took part in the Gulf War of 1991, with a battalion at the Battle of Khafji. It also hosted the U.S. 614th Tactical Fighter Squadron and the Canadian Air Task Group with 26 CF-18s both at Doha.

Since the Gulf War, Qatar has pursued a limited program of force modernization. Qatar has spent $12 billion to buy MIM-104 Patriot surface to air missiles. In July 2008, the US Defence Security Cooperation Agency announced Qatar's official request for logistics support, training, and associated equipment and services. The total value of the support arrangements could be as high as $400 million.

In March 2011, Qatar announced the participation of its Air Force in the enforcement of the Libyan no-fly zone.

Saudi Arabian-led intervention in Yemen 

According to Aljazeera news, in December 2016, Qatar deployed 1,000 ground troops in Yemen to fight on behalf of the ousted president Abdrabbuh Mansur Hadi. Qatari soldiers, backed by 200 armoured vehicles and 30 Apache helicopters, headed to Yemen's Marib province.

The Armed Forces of Qatar have suffered 4 killed and 2 wounded during their deployment in Yemen.

Military branches

Qatari Emiri Land Force

The Qatar Emiri Land Force is the largest land service branch of the Qatar Armed Forces.
Initially outfitted with British weaponry, Qatar shifted much of its procurement to France during the 1980s in response to French efforts to develop closer relations. The tank battalion was equipped with French-built AMX-30 main battle tanks, before later being replaced by German Leopard 2A7's. Other armored vehicles include French AMX-10P APCs and the French VAB, adopted as the standard wheeled combat vehicle. The artillery unit has a few French 155mm self-propelled howitzers. The principal antitank weapons are French MILAN and HOT wire-guided missiles.

Qatar had also illicitly acquired a few Stinger shoulder-fired SAMs, possibly from Afghan rebel groups, at a time when the United States was trying to maintain tight controls on Stingers in the Middle East. When Qatar refused to turn over the missiles, the United States Senate in 1988 imposed a ban on the sale of all weapons to Qatar. The ban was repealed in late 1990 when Qatar satisfactorily accounted for its disposition of the Stingers.

Qatari tank battalion fought in the Gulf war in 1991, their AMX-30s took part in the battle of Khafji. Qatari contingent, composed mostly of Pakistani recruits, acquitted itself well during the war.

Qatar signed a contract with the German defence company Krauss-Maffei Wegmann (KMW) for the delivery of 24 artillery systems PzH 2000 and 62 LEOPARD 2 main battle tanks.

The US DSCA announces that Qatar wants to join its neighbor the UAE, and field 2 medium-range THAAD batteries of its own.

Their request is worth up to $6.5 billion, and includes up to 12 THAAD Launchers, 150 THAAD missiles, 2 THAAD Fire Control and Communications units, 2 AN/TPY-2 THAAD Radars, and 1 Early Warning Radar (EWR). The USA would also sell them the required trucks, generators, electrical power units, trailers, communications equipment, fire unit test & maintenance equipment, system integration and checkout, repair and return, training, and other support.

Major Army Units examples 

Royal Guard Brigade
 1st Infantry Battalion 
 2nd Infantry Battalion
 3rd Infantry Battalion
Qatari Army
Special Forces Support Group  Company
1st Mechanized Infantry Battalion
2nd Mechanized Infantry Battalion
3d Mechanized Infantry Battalion
4th Mechanized Infantry Battalion (Reserve)
Artillery Battalion
Artillery Battery
Artillery Battery
Artillery Battery
Artillery Battery
Anti-aircraft Battery
Armored Brigade
Mortar Company
Tank Battalion
Mechanized Infantry Battalion
Anti-tank Battalion

Qatari Emiri Navy

The Qatari Emiri Navy (QEN), also called the Qatari Emiri Naval Forces (QENF), is the naval branch of the armed forces of the State of Qatar.

Qatari Emiri Air Force

The Qatari Emiri Air Force was formed in 1974, three years after achieving independence from Great Britain in 1971. Initially equipped with ex-RAF Hawker Hunters, the air force soon began expansion with six Dassault/Dornier Alpha Jets in 1979. Fourteen Dassault Mirage F1 were delivered between 1980 and 1984. After the Gulf War, Qatar's air force infrastructure was upgraded by France for $200 million, leading to the order of nine single seat Mirage 2000-5DEA multi-role combat aircraft and three two seat Mirage 2000-5DDA combat trainers in August 1994. Deliveries started in December 1997, and involved the buy back of the remaining 11 Mirage F1s by France that were later sold on to Spain. The current commander of the Qatar Emiri Air Force is Brigadier General Mubarak Mohammed Al Kumait Al Khayarin.

British pilots in Oman remain on duty with the air force, and French specialists are employed in a maintenance capacity. Nevertheless, an increasing number of young Qataris have been trained as pilots and technicians.

Its units include:
 No. 1 Fighter Wing
 No. 7 Air Superiority Squadron – Dassault Mirage 2000 
 9 single-seat Mirage 2000-5EDA
 3 2000-5DDA trainers
 No. 11 Close Support Squadron – Dassault/Dornier Alpha Jet 
 No. 2 Rotary Wing
 No. 6 Close Support Squadron – Eurocopter SA342 
 No. 8 Anti-Surface Vessel Squadron – Westland Sea King Commando Mk 3
 No. 9 Multi-Role Squadron – Westland Sea King Commando Mk 2
 Qatar Amiri Flight – C-17 Globemaster III

As of January 1993, all the air force's aircraft were based at Doha International Airport.

Rank structure
The rank insignia of commissioned officers.

The rank insignia of non-commissioned officers and enlisted personnel.

Equipment

See also

Military ranks of Qatar
Qatar Air Force
As Sayliyah Army Base

References

Military of Qatar
Qatar